The Extraordinary and Plenipotentiary Ambassador of Peru to the Republic of Guatemala is the official representative of the Republic of Peru to the Republic of Guatemala.

Both countries established relations in 1857, after Peruvian diplomat Pedro Gálvez Egúsquiza was sent in 1856 to Central America on a mission to establish and improve relations with the states of said region. Relations have continued since.

List of representatives

See also
List of ambassadors of Peru to Mexico
List of ambassadors of Peru to Colombia
List of ambassadors of Peru to Venezuela
List of ambassadors of Peru to Central America
List of ambassadors of Peru to Costa Rica
List of ambassadors of Peru to El Salvador
List of ambassadors of Peru to Honduras
List of ambassadors of Peru to Nicaragua
List of ambassadors of Peru to Panama

References

Guatemala
Peru